Mirchi may refer to:

Mirchi bada, spicy Indian doughnut
Mirchi ka salan, chilli curry
Mirchi (film), 2013 Indian film
Iqbal Mirchi (1950–2013), Indian drug kingpin
Radio Mirchi, Indian radio network
Mirchi Music Awards